Amber Dawn Miller is an American experimental cosmologist. She is a professor of physics and astronomy at the University of Southern California and the dean of the Dornsife College of Letters, Arts, and Sciences. She is an American Physical Society Fellow.

l. Miller received her B.A. in physics and astrophysics from the University of California, Berkeley in 1995 and her PhD in physics from Princeton University in 2000. As a postdoctoral scholar, she completed a NASA Hubble Fellowship at the University of Chicago.

Research and career 
Miller has published nearly 200 articles and journal entries related to the field of early universe cosmology, as well as a number of articles on atmospheric science. Her PhD thesis work was the first to provide evidence that the geometry of the universe is flat.

In 2002, she was appointed to the faculty of Columbia University and served as the first Dean of Science for the University's Faculty of Arts and Sciences from 2011–16.

Awards and honors 
Miller's awards include a National Science Foundation CAREER Award, an Alfred P. Sloan Fellowship and a Lenfest Distinguished Faculty Award. She was elected as a Fellow of the American Physical Society in 2014 "for important contributions to observations of the cosmic microwave background and development of innovative instrumentation for millimeter-wave cosmology."

References 

American cosmologists
American women physicists
21st-century American physicists
Year of birth missing (living people)
Living people
Fellows of the American Physical Society
American university and college faculty deans
Women deans (academic)
21st-century American women scientists